The 2011 WSA World Series Finals is the women's edition of the 2011 WSA World Series Finals (Prize money : $50 000). The event took place at the Queen's Club in London in England between 4–8 January 2012. Nicol David won her first WSA World Series Finlas trophy, beating Madeline Perry in the final.

Seeds

Group stage results

WSA 1

WSA 2

Draw and results

See also
2011 PSA World Series Finals
WSA World Series Finals
WSA World Series 2011

References

External links
WSA World Series Standings
World Series Final 2011 official website
World Series Final 2011 Squash Site website
World Series Final 2011 SquashInfo website

WSA World Tour
W
WSA World Series Finals
WSA World Series Finals
WSA World Series Finals
Squash competitions in London